Qadam Qadam Ishq was a 2019 Pakistani drama serial that premiered on A-Plus TV. It was directed by Kashif Saleem and written by Adil Hafeez. It featured Azfar Rehman and Areeba Habib.

Cast
Azfar Rehman as Raheel
Areeba Habib as Chand
Alyy Khan as Aftab, Chand's brother
Maira Khan as Chand's sister-in-law
Ayesha Gul
Yasir Ali Khan as Sikander

Production

The show was first named Adhura Alvida.

References

External links
Offici website

Pakistani drama television series
2019 Pakistani television series debuts
2019 Pakistani television series endings
Urdu-language television shows
A-Plus TV original programming